Electra Amelia Avellan and Elise Isabel Avellan (identical twins, born August 12, 1986) are Venezuelan actresses. They are best known for their roles as the "Crazy Babysitter Twins" in the 2007 film   Grindhouse and as Nurses "Mona and Lisa" in 2010's Machete. Electra and Elise reprised these roles in the 2013 Machete follow-up Machete Kills. They were born in Caracas, Venezuela. Their father is a sibling of producer Elizabeth Avellan, who was married to director Robert Rodriguez. Their mother was a model and actress. The twins appear together in the April 2007 issue of Maxim En Espanol.

Electra filmography

Elise filmography

References

External links

 
 

1986 births
Living people
Venezuelan film actresses
Actresses from Caracas
Venezuelan twins
Identical twin actresses